Girl Gang is an American crime film, co-written, edited and directed by Robert C. Dertano and co-written and produced under the personal supervision of George Weiss.  The film starred Joanne Arnold and Timothy Farrell and was released in 1954.

Plot
Joe (Timothy Farrell) controls a gang of young girls who commit robberies and prostitution for him by getting them hooked on drugs.

Cast
 Joanne Arnold as June
 Timothy Farrell as Joe the Big Boss
 Harry Keaton as Doc Bradford (as Harry Keatan)
 Lou Monson as Jack the Mechanic
 Mary Lou O'Connor as Wanda Johnson
 Mildred Kalke as Daisy, Joe's Girlfriend
 Norman Stanley as Brown, June's Employer
 Thelma Montgomery Gang Girl
 Bernard Carroll		
 Ray Morton			
 Marie Metier as Gang Girl
 Irene Gilmore as Gang Girl
 Peggy Winters as Gang Girl

Rest of cast listed alphabetically
 Miliza Milo Woman Calling the Police (uncredited)

Produced by
 George Weiss

Supervising producer Cinematography by
 William C. Thompson - director of photography Film Editing by 
 Robert C. Dertano - (as Bob Derteno) Set Decoration by 
 James R. Connell (uncredited) Art Department 
 James R. Connell set designer Sound Department 
 Dale Knight - sound recordist Special Effects by 
 Ray Mercer - special effects Camera and Electrical Department 
 Bert Shipman - camera operator (as Bert Shippan) Crew verified as complete

References

External links

American crime drama films
1954 films
1954 crime drama films
American black-and-white films
American independent films
1950s English-language films
1950s American films